Loncopué is a department located in the west of Neuquén Province, Argentina.

The department is the site of an ongoing dispute between local Mapuche communities and Chinese mining interest. It is the first such conflict in Neuquén Province.

Geography
The Department limits with Ñorquín Department at north, Pehuenches Department at north east, Confluencia Department at east, Picunches Department at south and Chile at east.

References

Departments of Neuquén Province